Andrea Dal Col (born 30 April 1991) is an Italian former professional racing cyclist, who rode professionally for  between 2014 and 2016.

Major results
2012
1st Stage 2b (ITT) Giro Ciclistico d'Italia
2014
1st Stage 6 (ITT) Vuelta al Táchira
2015
1st Stage 5 Tour do Rio

References

External links
 

1991 births
Living people
Italian male cyclists
People from Conegliano
Cyclists from the Province of Treviso